Andrew Nisbet (born August 1960) is a Director of Key West Holdings, which holds his family's interests in catering supplies and property. He is also founder of catering supplies retailer Nisbets Plc.

Between 2012 and 2013, he was High Sheriff of Bristol.

Early life 
After leaving school in 1978, Nisbet joined his father's business, Peter Nisbet & Co. The business distributed catering equipment in the South West England.

Career 
In 1983, Nisbet founded Nisbets, originally selling knives, catering clothing and textbooks to catering students. The business launched a Mail-Order Catalogue in 1987 and moved into wholesale in 1990. Between 1995 and 2017 the business underwent international expansion. The business was also one of the first catering equipment distributors to adapt its business online.

As of February 2017, the business employs more than 2,000 people and has offices in nine countries. The business also has retail outlets in the UK, Ireland and Australia. In 2017, turnover of the business was £400 million, according to The Sunday Times. The company sells 25,000 products in more than 100 countries.

In 2014, Nisbet became a Director of Key West Holdings, which holds his family's interests in catering equipment and property. In 2015, Key West Holdings acquired catering hire firm Jongor Hire.

Personal life 
Andrew Nisbet lives in Bristol, UK with his wife Anne. The couple have argued that family businesses play a fundamental role in the British economy.

In 2012, the Nisbet family founded The Nisbet Trust, which provides grants to charitable organisations in the Greater Bristol area.

Between 2012 and 2013, Andrew Nisbet was High Sheriff of Bristol. He sits on the Board of Bristol Music Trust.

Since 2001, Nisbet has been a member of The Society of Merchant Venturers, a private club whose membership is invited "from individuals who have been successful in their chosen area of business".

References 

1960 births
People from Clifton, Bristol
Living people
Businesspeople from Bristol
British retail company founders
British businesspeople in retailing
Members of the Society of Merchant Venturers
High Sheriffs of Bristol